Loverna is an unincorporated hamlet in Antelope Park Rural Municipality No. 322, Saskatchewan, Canada. The population of Loverna was 5 at the 2001 Canada Census. The hamlet is approximately 50 km northwest of the Town of Kindersley at the intersection of Highway 772 and Range road 290. The Grand Trunk Pacific played a big role in the town's economy when it was completed in 1913 on its way from Biggar, SK to Hemaruka, AB.  The line was planned as a thorough route, however the planned connection to another line under construction at the time to Spondin, AB was never finished. The track was lightly built and poorly maintained and so could only support boxcars and lightweight hopper cars for grain loading.  As well the line was restricted to special lightweight GMD-1 locomotives. During the drastic closure of uneconomic branch lines in the late 1970s and '80s the tracks west from Smiley through Loverna were closed.  The Canadian Pacific Railway took over operation of the remaining track from a connection on their line at Dodsland to Smiley.  This too was closed in 1996, and Loverna's population has since declined.

History 
Prior to March 10, 2003, Loverna was incorporated under village status, but was restructured as a hamlet under the jurisdiction of the Rural municipality of Antelope Park on that date.

Demographics 

See also

 List of communities in Saskatchewan
 Hamlets of Saskatchewan

References

Antelope Park No. 322, Saskatchewan
Designated places in Saskatchewan
Former villages in Saskatchewan
Populated places disestablished in 2003
Unincorporated communities in Saskatchewan
Ghost towns in Saskatchewan
Division No. 13, Saskatchewan